Manuel Pérez y Curis (May 21, 1884 – November 22, 1920) was a Uruguayan poet, born in Montevideo, Uruguay.

Biography

Pérez y Curis was the son of Julián Pérez Rial and Manuela Curis.

Apolo magazine, which appeared monthly and contained articles on art and sociology, is the main source of his written work. his main written work. Another important work is La arquitectura del verso (The Architecture of the Verse) (1913), published in France  and in Mexico; the writing secretary was Ovidio Fernández Ríos.

The critic and essayist Alberto Zum Felde published in this magazine La Hiperbórea and Lulú Margat.

The work of Uruquayan poet Delmira Agustini appeared in almost every issue of Apolo. Her poem "Las coronas" appeared in 1908.

Stricken by tuberculosis, Pérez y Curis died in 1920, at the age of 36.

Works

 Revista Apolo (1905–1909)
 La arquitectura del verso (1913)
 Romances y seguidillas del Plata (1940, Posthumous)
 Heliostropos (1906)
 El poema de la carne
 La canción de las crisaldas
 El gesto contemplativo (1914)

References

Works cited

 Elizabeth Durand. El Día. Sunday supplement. Year XLVIII N° 2428. Apolo Una Revista de la Primera Decada del 900.Montevideo, April 27, 1980.
 Elizabeth Durand. El Día.  Sunday supplement. Year XLVIII N° 2430. Manuel Pérez y Curis: Un Realizador con Destino de Silencio,Montevideo, May 11, 1980.
 La Enciclopedia de El Pais, Tomo 1. Apolo,Montevideo, 2011.

External links
Nomenclatura de Montevideo (Intendencia Municipal de Montevideo)

20th-century Uruguayan poets
Uruguayan male poets
1884 births
1920 deaths
People from Montevideo
20th-century deaths from tuberculosis
20th-century Uruguayan male writers
Tuberculosis deaths in Uruguay